The Dissolution of Eternity is the third studio album by the Austrian neoclassical dark wave band Dargaard. It was recorded, mixed and mastered at Tonstudio Hoernix during 1999-2000.

Track listing

Credits
Tharen - all instruments, vocals
Elisabeth Toriser - vocals

2001 albums
Neoclassical dark wave albums
Dark ambient albums
Dargaard albums
Napalm Records albums